George Edward Williams (born Q1 1880 in Aldershot, Hampshire; date of death unknown) was an English first-class cricketer.

Williams made a single first-class appearance for Hampshire in 1904, against Somerset.

In 1908 Williams joined Berkshire and represented the county in one Minor Counties Championship match during that season, making his debut against Buckinghamshire. In 1909 Williams played four matches for Berkshire, with his last appearance for the county coming against Wiltshire. After the 1909 season Williams made no further County Cricket appearances.

External links
George Williams at Cricinfo
George Williams at CricketArchive

1880 births
Cricketers from Aldershot
English cricketers
Hampshire cricketers
Berkshire cricketers
Year of death missing